The 1933 UCI Road World Championships took place in Montlhéry, France between 14 and 15 August 1933

Events Summary

References

 
UCI Road World Championships by year
W
R
R